Acadian Park, also known as Acadian Ballpark, is a baseball stadium located in New Iberia, Louisiana, United States. It served as the home ballpark for the New Iberia Rebels, New Iberia Pelicans, New Iberia Cardinals and New Iberia Indians, each of whom played in the Evangeline League.

It is still currently in use, serving high school baseball teams.

References

Baseball venues in Louisiana
Sports venues in Louisiana
High school baseball venues in the United States
New Iberia, Louisiana